Saint-Paul is the second-largest commune in the French overseas department of Réunion. It is located on the extreme west side of the island of Réunion.

Until 1999, near Saint Paul there was the 428 metres tall mast OMEGA Chabrier transmitter.

Population

Transport 
Saint-Paul was to be the western terminus of the proposed Réunion Tram Train. However, the project was abandoned in May 2010 due to a lack of funds.

The traditional grave of French pirate Olivier Levasseur, nicknamed La Buse ("The Buzzard") or La Bouche ("The Mouth"), who was most famous for allegedly hiding one of the biggest treasures in pirate history, estimated at over £1 billion, is located in Saint-Paul's Cimetière marin de Saint-Paul cemetery. Besides pirates, the cemetery also serves as the permanent resting place of poets Leconte de Lisle and Eugène Dayot, as well as the painter Arthur Grimaud.

Geography

Climate 
Saint-Paul has a tropical savanna climate (Köppen Aw), closely bordering on a hot semi-arid climate (BSh).

See also
Communes of the Réunion department
Saint-Pauloise FC

References

External links 

  (in French)
 Video du Marché 

Communes of Réunion
Cities in Réunion
Subprefectures in France
Cities in France